Transaction Network Services (TNS) is a privately held, multinational company in the payments, financial and telecommunications industries. TNS is the supplier of networking, integrated data, and voice services to many organizations in the global payments and financial communities, as well as a provider of telecommunications network solutions to service providers.

History

 1990 – TNS founded in the US to provide services to the point-of-sale/payments industry
 1994 – Initial public offering – NASDAQ listed
 1995 – TNS' Telecommunications Services division launched
 1996 – International offices launched in the UK, Canada and Ireland and TNS' Financial Services division launched
 1998 – Acquired AT&T's Transaction Access Service (USA)
 1999 – Offices opened in Australia, France and Japan. Processing services launched in the UK. Listed on the NYSE. 
 1999 –  Acquired by PSINet for $705 million (US$1.1 Billion (2019))
 2000 – Office opened in Spain
 2001 – Management, in conjunction with private equity firm GTCR Golder Rauner LLC, bought back TNS from PSINet
 2002 – Office opened in Italy
 2003 – Acquired Openet (Italy) and Transpoll Offline (UK) 
 2004 – Initial Public Offering – NYSE listing
 2005 – Acquired Connect Ro (Romania)
 2006 – Offices opened in India, Thailand and South Korea. Acquired Comms XL (UK), InfiniRoute Networks Inc. (USA), Sonic Inc. (USA) and JPG Telecom SAS (France)
 2007 – Acquired Dialect Payment Technologies (Australia)
 2008 – Offices opened in Hong Kong and Singapore
 2009 – Acquired Verisign's Communication Services Group (USA)
 2010 – Acquired Cequint, Inc. (USA)
 2013 – Office opened in Taiwan. TNS acquired by Siris Capital Group LLC in a take-private transaction
 2015 – Sells Call Authentication assets to Neustar
 2016 – Received investment led by Koch Equity Development LLC
2017 – Offices opened in New Zealand and the Philippines
2018 – Acquired Advam 
2019 – Acquired Link Solutions (Brazil), OpSiSe (France), and R2G (Chicago)
2021 – Acquired by Koch Equity Development LLC

References 

Companies based in Reston, Virginia
American companies established in 1990